Fernando Lúcio da Costa, better known as Fernandão (18 March 1978 – 7 June 2014), was a Brazilian professional footballer who played as a striker.

Career
Having started his career at Goiás of Goiânia, Fernandão had a four-year spell in France, initially moving to Marseille for R$1.4 million, before returning to Brazil to play for Internacional. He helped the club finish as runners-up in the 2005 season of the Campeonato Brasileiro Série A. In the same year, he had his first cap against Guatemala and made an assist for forward Fred to nearly score a goal - the ball hit the post.

2006 was arguably Fernandão's best year. He led Sport Club Internacional to win the Copa Libertadores for the first time ever. Fernandão was a joint top scorer of the competition and was voted man of the Match in the final against São Paulo, match in which he scored one goal and made one assist. After the win, he extended his contract with Sport Club Internacional and skippered the club to win the FIFA Club World Cup in December. In May 2010 the same Brazilian club São Paulo FC announced the signing of striker Fernandão of Goiás for an undisclosed fee. In May 2011 the two sides agreed to terminate the playing contract between them in a friendly manner.

As coach
On 20 July 2012, Internacional, after the firing of Dorival Júnior, announced Fernandão as their new coach. On 20 November, however, Fernandão was dismissed by the club's directory.

Death 
On 7 June 2014, Fernandão, at the age of 36, died in a helicopter crash. The Eurocopter AS350 where he was with four more people crashed by around 1 a.m. in Aruanã, Goiás, Brazil. All occupants were found dead. His wake was at the training center of Fernandão's first team Goiás, before a burial in Goiânia.  In Porto Alegre, the city where he had the most success as part of Internacional, the club proceeded to homage Fernandão by unveiling a statue of his outside of Beira-Rio later that year, while in 2015 one of the streets outside the stadium received his name.

Honours

Club

Copa Centro-Oeste: 2000, 2001
Campeonato Goiano: 1996, 1997, 1998, 1999 e 2000
Campeonato Gaúcho: 2005, 2008
Copa Libertadores de América: 2006
FIFA Club World Cup: 2006
Recopa Sudamericana: 2007
Dubai Cup: 2008

Individual
 Campeonato Brasileiro Série A Team of the Year: 2006
 Bola de Prata: 2006

References

External links
Fernandão – official website 

1978 births
2014 deaths
Sportspeople from Goiânia
Association football forwards
Brazilian footballers
Brazil international footballers
Brazil under-20 international footballers
Brazilian expatriate footballers
Campeonato Brasileiro Série A players
Ligue 1 players
Goiás Esporte Clube players
Olympique de Marseille players
Toulouse FC players
Sport Club Internacional players
São Paulo FC players
Expatriate footballers in France
Expatriate footballers in Qatar
Al-Gharafa SC players
Qatar Stars League players
Brazilian football managers
 Copa Libertadores-winning players
Sport Club Internacional managers
Victims of aviation accidents or incidents in Brazil
Victims of aviation accidents or incidents in 2014
Victims of helicopter accidents or incidents